The men's decathlon event of the athletics events at the 2011 Pan American Games was held  the 24 and 25 of October at the Telmex Athletics Stadium. The defending Pan American Games champion is Maurice Smith of the Jamaica.

Records
Prior to this competition, the existing world and Pan American Games records were as follows:

Qualification
Each National Olympic Committee (NOC) was able to enter up to two entrants providing they had met the minimum standard  (6750) in the qualifying period (January 1, 2010 to September 14, 2011).

Schedule

Results
All distances shown are in meters:centimeters

100 metres

Long jump

Shot put

High jump

400 metres

110 metres hurdles

Discus throw

Pole vault

Javelin throw

1500 metres

Final standings

References

Athletics at the 2011 Pan American Games
2011